The 2018–19 FC Copenhagen season was F.C. Copenhagen's 27th season of existence, competing each year in the Danish Superliga, the top tier of football in Denmark. In addition to capturing its 13th Danish Superliga championship, FCK competed in the Danish Cup, exiting in the fourth round, and the UEFA Europa League, advancing to the group stage.

Kits

Squad

Transfers and loans

Arrivals

Summer

Winter

Departures

Summer

Winter

Loan in

Loan out

Non-competitive

Pre-season Friendlies

Competitive

Competition record

Danish Superliga

Regular season

Matches

Championship Round

Matches

Sydbank Pokalen

Danish Cup Matches

UEFA Europa League

First qualifying round

Second qualifying round

Third qualifying round

Playoff round

Group stage

Group C

Statistics

Appearances 

This includes all competitive matches.

Goalscorers 

This includes all competitive matches.

Assists 

This includes all competitive matches.

Clean Sheets 

This includes all competitive matches.

Disciplinary record 

This includes all competitive matches.

Awards

Team

Individual

References 

Danish football clubs 2018–19 season
F.C. Copenhagen seasons